This article contains information about the literary events and publications of 1917.

Events

January
Francis Picabia produces the first issue of the Dada periodical 391 in Barcelona.
Philosopher Hu Shih, the main advocate of replacing scholarly language with the vernacular in Chinese literature, publishes an article in the magazine New Youth (Xin Qingnian), "A Preliminary Discussion of Literature Reform", offering eight guidelines for writers.
J. R. R. Tolkien, on medical leave from the British Army at Great Haywood, begins The Book of Lost Tales (the first version of The Silmarillion), starting with the "Fall of Gondolin". This first chronicles Tolkien's mythopoeic Middle-earth legendarium in prose.
February 4 or 5 – The English writer Hugh Kingsmill is captured in action in France.
February 16 – The publisher Boni & Liveright is founded in New York City by Horace Liveright with Albert Boni, and initiates the "Modern Library" imprint.
April – Leonard and Virginia Woolf take delivery of a hand printing press needed to establish the Hogarth Press at their home in Richmond upon Thames. Their first publication is Two Stories.
May – W. B. Yeats acquires Thoor Ballylee in Ireland.
June 4 – The first Pulitzer Prizes are awarded: Laura E. Richards, Maude H. Elliott, and Florence Hall receive the first for biography (for Julia Ward Howe), Jean Jules Jusserand the first for history with With Americans of Past and Present Days, and Herbert B. Swope the first for journalism for his work for the New York World.
June 18 – Luigi Pirandello's drama Right You Are (if you think so) (Così è (se vi pare)) is first performed, in Milan.
July – Siegfried Sassoon issues a "Soldier's Declaration" against prolonging World War I. He is sent by the military (with assistance from Robert Graves) to Edinburgh's Craiglockhart War Hospital, where Wilfred Owen introduces himself on August 18. At Sassoon's urging, Owen writes his two great war poems, "Anthem for Doomed Youth" and "Dulce et Decorum est", although like almost all his poetry they remain unpublished until after his death in action next year. Their meeting would later inspire Stephen MacDonald's drama Not About Heroes (1982) and Pat Barker's novel Regeneration (1991).
Summer – The Siuru expressionist and neo-romantic literary movement in Estonia is formed by young poets and writers.
September 6 – At the National Eisteddfod of Wales in Birkenhead, the Chairing of the Bard ceremony ends with the chair draped in black, the winner, Hedd Wyn, having died a month earlier in battle.
October
Ernest Hemingway takes his first job, as a reporter on The Kansas City Star.
D. H. Lawrence is forced to leave Cornwall at three days' notice under terms of the Defence of the Realm Act in the United Kingdom.
October 20 – The 51-year-old poet W. B. Yeats marries 25-year-old Georgie Hyde-Lees at Harrow Road register office in London, with Ezra Pound as best man, a couple of months after his proposal of marriage to his ex-mistress's daughter, Iseult Gonne, is rejected.
December 25 – Jesse Lynch Williams' Why Marry?, the first drama to win a Pulitzer Prize, opens at the Astor Theatre (New York).
unknown dates
The colonial government of the Dutch East Indies establishes the Kantoor voor de Volklectuur ("Office for People's Reading"), later renamed Balai Pustaka.
The Marc Chagall illustrated version of The Magician (דער קונצענמאכער, Der Kuntsenmakher) by I. L. Peretz (died 1915) appears in Vilnius.

New books

Fiction
Elizabeth von Arnim – Christine
Mariano Azuela – Los caciques (The Bosses)
Henri Barbusse – Under Fire (first English language edition)
E. F. Benson
An Autumn Sowing
Mr. Teddy
Adrien Bertrand – L'Orage sur le jardin de Candide (The thunderstorm in Candide's garden)
Rhoda Broughton – A Thorn in the Flesh
Edgar Rice Burroughs
A Princess of Mars
The Son of Tarzan
Abraham Cahan – The Rise of David Levinsky
Gilbert Cannan – The Stucco House
Sarat Chandra Chattopadhyay – Devdas
 J. Storer Clouston – The Spy in Black
Mary Cholmondeley – Under One Roof
Joseph Conrad – The Shadow Line (serialization concluded and in book form)
Clemence Dane – Regiment of Women
Miguel de Unamuno – Abel Sánchez
 Ethel M. Dell – The Hundredth Chance
Norman Douglas – South Wind
Arthur Conan Doyle – His Last Bow (collected Sherlock Holmes stories)
Edna Ferber – Fanny Herself
Anna Katharine Green – The Mystery of the Hasty Arrow 
Zona Gale – A Daughter of the Morning
Joseph Hergesheimer – The Three Black Pennys
 Robert Hichens – In the Wilderness
Ricarda Huch – The Deruga Case (Der Fall Deruga)
Henry James (posthumously)
The Ivory Tower
The Sense of the Past
Gaston Leroux – Rouletabille at Krupp's
Sinclair Lewis – The Job
Jack London – Jerry of the Islands
Oscar Micheaux – The Homesteader
Christopher Morley – Parnassus on Wheels
Baroness Orczy
Lord Tony's Wife
A Sheaf of Bluebells
David Graham Phillips – Susan Lenox: Her Rise and Fall
Marmaduke Pickthall – Knights of Araby
Ernest Poole – His Family
Horacio Quiroga – Cuentos de amor de locura y de muerte
Henry Handel Richardson (Et Florence Robertson) – Australia Felix (first part of The Fortunes of Richard Mahony)
May Sinclair – The Tree of Heaven
Annie M. P. Smithson – Her Irish Heritage
Hermann Sudermann – The Excursion to Tilsit (Litauische Geschichten)
Ivan Tavčar – Cvetje v jeseni (Flowers in Autumn)
 Edgar Wallace – The Secret House
Robert Walser – Der Spaziergang (The Walk)
Mary Augusta Ward
Missing
Towards the Goal
The War and Elizabeth
Alec Waugh – The Loom of Youth
Mary Webb – Gone to Earth
Edith Wharton – SummerP. G. WodehouseThe Man with Two Left Feet (collected stories)Piccadilly JimChildren and young people
Lucy Maud Montgomery – Anne's House of DreamsBeatrix Potter – Appley Dapply's Nursery RhymesElse Ury – Nesthäkchen and the World WarDrama
Leonid Andreyev – The Life of Man
Guillaume Apollinaire – The Breasts of Tiresias (Les mamelles de Tirésias, written 1903, first performed)
Bruce Bairnsfather and Arthur Elliot – The Better 'Ole
J. M. Barrie – Dear Brutus
Dorothy Brandon – Wild Heather
Ferdinand Bruckner – Der Herr in den Nebeln
Hall Caine – The Woman Thou Gavest Me
Gilbert Cannan – Everybody's Husband
Jean Cocteau – Parade
John Drinkwater – X = 0: A Night of the Trojan War
John Galsworthy – Justice
Mary P. Hamlin and George Arliss – Hamilton
Georg Kaiser
The Burghers of Calais (Die Bürger von Calais, written 1913, first performed)
The Coral (Die Koralle)
From Morning to Midnight (Von Morgens bis Mitternachts, written 1912, first performed)
Somerset Maugham – Our Betters
A. A. Milne – Wurzel-Flummery
Luigi Pirandello – Right You Are (if you think so)
Gertrude Stein – An Exercise in Analysis 
Ridgely Torrence – Three Plays for a Negro Theater
Brita von Horn – Kring drottningen
Jesse Lynch Williams – Why Marry?

Poetry

Lascelles Abercrombie – Emblems Of LoveMay Wedderburn Cannan – In War TimeT. S. Eliot – Prufrock, and other observationsRobert Graves – Fairies and FusiliersIvor Gurney – Severn and SommeJames Weldon Johnson – Fifty Years and Other PoemsJoseph Lee – Work-a-Day WarriorsEdna St. Vincent Millay - Renascense and Other PoemsSiegfried Sassoon – The Old Huntsman, and Other PoemsAlan Seeger (posthumously) – Poems (including "I have a rendezvous with Death")
Edward Thomas (posthumously) – Poems (including "Adlestrop")
William Watson – The Man Who Saw: and Other Poems Arising out of the WarW. B. Yeats – The Wild Swans at Coole, Other Verses and a Play in VerseNon-fiction
G. K. Chesterton – A Short History of EnglandDaniel Jones – An English Pronouncing DictionaryHenry Festing Jones – Samuel Butler, Author of Erewhon (1835–1902)Theodore Wesley Koch – Books in Camp, Trench and HospitalRudolf Otto – The Idea of the Holy (Das Heilige)
Alfred W. Pollard – Shakespeare's Fight with the Pirates and the Problems of the Transmission of His TextD'Arcy Wentworth Thompson – On Growth and FormFrancis Brett Young – Marching on TangaBirths
January 6 – Maeve Brennan, Irish-born short story writer and journalist (died 1993)
February 11 – Sidney Sheldon, American novelist (died 2007)
February 25 – Anthony Burgess, English novelist (died 1993)
March 1 – Robert Lowell, American poet (died 1977)
March 8 – Dimitrie Stelaru (Dumitru Petrescu), Romanian poet and novelist (died 1971)
March 17 – Carlo Cassola, Italian novelist (died 1987)
April 9 – Johannes Bobrowski, German author (died 1965)
April 19 – Sven Hassel (Børge Pedersen), Danish novelist (died 2012)
May 16 – Juan Rulfo, Mexican fiction writer (died 1986)
June 7 – Gwendolyn Brooks, American poet (died 2000)
June 13 – Augusto Roa Bastos, Paraguayan novelist (died 2005)
June 16 – Katharine Graham, American journalist (died 2001)
June 28 – A. E. Hotchner, American writer (died 2020)
July 8 – J. F. Powers, American author (died 1999)
July 15 – Robert Conquest, English-born historian and poet (died 2015)
August 24 – Ruth Park, New Zealand children's writer (died 2010)
October 5 – Magda Szabó, Hungarian novelist, dramatist and essayist (died 2007)
October 24 – Denys Val Baker, Welsh writer (died 1984)
October 31 – Patience Gray, English cookery and travel writer (died 2005)
November 3 – Conor Cruise O'Brien, Irish biographer and political writer (died 2008)
November 12 – Leila Berg, English children's author and education writer (died 2015)
November 28 – Marni Hodgkin (Marion Rous), American children's book editor (died 2015)
December 14 – Tove Ditlevsen, Danish poet and fiction writer (suicide 1976)
December 16 – Sir Arthur C. Clarke, English fiction writer (died 2008)
December 21
Diana Athill, English author and editor (died 2019)
Heinrich Böll, German Nobel Prize winning novelist (died 1985)
December 27 – Onni Palaste, Finnish novelist (died 2009)date unknown'' – Fadwa Tuqan, Palestinian poet (died 2003)

Deaths
January 15 – William De Morgan, English novelist and potter (born 1839)
January 18 – Andrew Murray, South African minister, writer and teacher (born 1828)
January 20 – Agnes Leonard Hill, American author, journalist, enangelist, social reformer (born 1842)
February – Emma Pike Ewing, American author and educator (born 1838)
February 16 – Octave Mirbeau, French novelist and critic (born 1848)
April 3 – Arthur Graeme West, English war poet and military writer (killed in action, born 1891)
April 9
Edward Thomas, British poet and prose writer (killed in action, born 1878)
R. E. Vernède, English war poet (killed in action, born 1875)
April 14 – L. L. Zamenhof, Polish creator of Esperanto (born 1859)
April 17 – Jane Barlow, Irish novelist and poet (born 1856)
April 21 – F. C. Burnand, English dramatist and editor (born 1836)
May 13 – Gustav Jaeger, German naturalist (born 1832)
June (date unknown) - Katharine Sarah Macquoid, British novelist and travel writer (born 1824)
June 1 – Joseph Ashby-Sterry, English poet and comic writer (born 1836 or 1838)
June 18 – Titu Maiorescu, Romanian culture critic, philosopher, and politician (born 1840)
July 31
Francis Ledwidge, English war poet (killed in action, born 1887)
Hedd Wyn, Welsh-language poet (killed in action, born 1887)
September 28 – T. E. Hulme, English critic (killed in action, born 1883)
October 16 – Walter Flex, German author (died of wounds, born 1887)
November 15 – Émile Durkheim, French sociologist (born 1858)
November 16 – Georges de Peyrebrune, French novelist (born 1841)
November 18 – Adrien Bertrand, French novelist (died of wounds, born 1888)
December 27 – George Diamandy, Romanian journalist, dramatist, and political figure (angina, born 1867)

Awards
Nobel Prize for Literature: Karl Adolph Gjellerup, Henrik Pontoppidan

See also
World War I in literature

References

 
Years of the 20th century in literature